Hymnus is Latin for hymn, a song of religious devotion or prayer.

Hymnus may also refer to:

 Hymnus (Greek mythology), a shepherd in Nonnus' Dionysiaca
 Hymnus, in Roman mythology, one of the four sons of Entoria fathered by Saturn